A Mouthful of Air is a 2021 American psychological drama film written, directed and produced by Amy Koppelman, based on her 2003 novel of the same name. It stars Amanda Seyfried, Finn Wittrock, Jennifer Carpenter, Michael Gaston, Amy Irving, and Paul Giamatti.

It was released on October 29, 2021 by Stage 6 Films.

Plot 
On the eve of her baby son's first birthday, Julie Davis survives a suicide attempt. In the following weeks of her recovery, she tries to show gratitude for the positive things in life, but continues to suffer ongoing anxiety. Julie's discovery that she is pregnant for a second time forces her to face the traumas of her upbringing.

Cast
Amanda Seyfried as Julie Davis
Cate Elefante as young Julie Davis
Finn Wittrock as Ethan Davis
Amy Irving as Bobbi Davis
Jennifer Carpenter as Lucy
Paul Giamatti as Dr. Sylvester
Britt Robertson as Rachel Davis
Eliot Sumner as Doughnuts
Alysia Reiner as Pam
Michael Gaston as Ron
Josh Hamilton as Dr. Salzman

Production
In September 2019, it was announced Amanda Seyfried, Finn Wittrock, Amy Irving, Jennifer Carpenter, and Paul Giamatti had joined the cast of the film, with Amy Koppelman directing from a screenplay she wrote. Principal photography began in September 2019.

Release
In April 2021, Sony Pictures Worldwide Acquisitions acquired worldwide distribution rights to the film. It was released on October 29, 2021.

Reception
On review aggregator Rotten Tomatoes, 68% of 31 critics have given the film a positive review, with an average rating of 6.2/10. The website's critics consensus reads, "A Mouthful of Air isn't as emotionally impactful as it might have been, but Amanda Seyfried's devastating performance lends the story weight." On Metacritic, the film has a weighted average score of 52 out of 100 based on 11 critics, indicating "mixed or average reviews".

David Ehrlich of IndieWire critiqued the film's use of melodrama, but praised Seyfried's performance, writing she "sidesteps histrionics in favor of something more honest and upsetting" and "leads every scene with such an excitable degree of fear and fragility". Peter Bradshaw of The Guardian was more critical, writing the film "needed less sensitive good taste and more explicit storytelling passion." Natalia Winkelman of The New York Times wrote "the movie’s portrait of depression often feels as facile as its opening image: Julie’s wide blue eyes with a single tear trailing down her cheek."

References

External links

2021 drama films
2021 directorial debut films
2021 independent films
2020s English-language films
2020s psychological drama films
2020s pregnancy films
American psychological drama films
American pregnancy films
Films set in 1995
Films based on American novels
Films about parenting
Postpartum depression in film
Films produced by Trudie Styler
Stage 6 Films films
2020s American films